Ricardo Enrique Buitrago Medina (Panama City) is a Panamanian footballer who plays for Plaza Amador as a midfielder.

Club career
Buitrago began his career on hometown's club Plaza Amador, but later moved to Colombia, signing a contract with Deportes Quindío. After two years on Quindío, he moved back to Plaza Amador. In February 2012, he moved to Spain, signing a contract with Elche, being assigned for the "B" team. On June, he was promoted to first team squad.

On 12 September 2012, Buitrago made his debut, in a Copa del Rey match against Córdoba CF. However, on 31 January 2013, he was released from Elche, alongside Jaime Jornet.

On 19 April, Buitrago signed a contract with fifth division club CD Almoradí. On 3 July, he returned to his homeland, signing with Plaza Amador. On 28 January of the following year Buitrago moved teams and countries again, signing with Cartaginés. He moved abroad once more, joining Peruvian side Juan Aurich in summer 2015., and then to Deportivo Municipal in 2018.

International career
Buitrago played at the 2005 World Youth Championship in the Netherlands.

On 8 September 2010, Buitrago made his senior debut with Panama national team, against Trinidad & Tobago. He scored his first goal on 7 October 2011, against Dominica.

In May 2018, he was named in Panama’s preliminary 35 man squad for the 2018 World Cup in Russia. However, he did not make the final 23.

International goals
Scores and results list Panama's goal tally first.

Personal life
Nicknamed el Halconcito, he is a son of former Panama international striker Ricardo el Halcón Buitrago.

References

External links
 
 
 Futbolme profile 

1985 births
Living people
Sportspeople from Panama City
Association football midfielders
Panamanian footballers
Panamanian expatriate footballers
Panama international footballers
2011 Copa Centroamericana players
Copa América Centenario players
2017 Copa Centroamericana players
C.D. Plaza Amador players
Deportes Quindío footballers
Elche CF players
C.S. Cartaginés players
Juan Aurich footballers
Deportivo Municipal footballers
Tercera División players
Categoría Primera A players
Liga Panameña de Fútbol players
Peruvian Primera División players
Panamanian expatriate sportspeople in Spain
Panamanian expatriate sportspeople in Colombia
Panamanian expatriate sportspeople in Costa Rica
Panamanian expatriate sportspeople in Peru
Expatriate footballers in Spain
Expatriate footballers in Colombia
Expatriate footballers in Costa Rica
Expatriate footballers in Peru